Sesquiluna is a genus of moths of the Endromidae family.

Species
Sesquiluna albilunata (Hampson, 1910)
Sesquiluna forbesi Zolotuhin & Witt, 2009
Sesquiluna theophoboides Zolotuhin & Witt, 2009

References

 , 2009: The Bombycidae of Vietnam. Entomofauna Supplement 16: 231-272.

 
Endromidae